The Midleton Distillery may refer to:

 The Jameson Experience, Midleton, also known as the Old Midleton Distillery, a distillery which operated in Midleton, County Cork, Ireland from 1825 to 1975
 The New Midleton Distillery, a new distillery built alongside the existing Old Midleton Distillery, opened in 1975

Buildings and structures disambiguation pages